Edward Bennett Rosa (4 October 1873, Rogersville, Steuben County – 17 May 1921, Washington, D. C.) was an American physicist, specialising in measurement science.

He received B.S. at Wesleyan University (1886) and taught physics at a school in Providence, Rhode Island before graduate studies in physics at Johns Hopkins University, obtaining a Ph.D. in 1891 on the thesis entitled The Specific Inductive Capacity of Electrolytes, advised by Henry Augustus Rowland.
After a short stay at University of Wisconsin (1890) he was professor of physics at
Wesleyan University (1891–1901) where he and Wilbur Olin Atwater developed a
respiration calorimeter which for human beings confirmed conservation of energy laws and allowed for  calculation of caloric values of different foods. He also made an early
curve tracer for alternating currents.  He then joined as head of the electrical research division at
National Bureau of Standards (1901) where he,
Noah Ernest Dorsey and Frederick Grover, developed a variety of  measurement devices.  With
George Wood Vinal he made an amperemeter based on a silver voltameter.
He also headed the Safety Code division that defined the National Electrical Code.  Rosa died while at work.

Awards
Elliott Cresson Medal of the Franklin Institute 1898 for the respiration calorimeter
Fellow of the American Institute of Electrical Engineers and American Physical Society
Elected to the National Academy of Sciences 1913
The E. B. Rosa Award is offered by National Institute of Standards and Technology.

References

1873 births
1921 deaths
Wesleyan University faculty
Wesleyan University alumni
Johns Hopkins University alumni
American physicists
American electrical engineers
People from Steuben County, New York
Members of the United States National Academy of Sciences
Engineers from New York (state)
Scientists from New York (state)